Azzedine Dkidak (born 11 May 2000) is a professional footballer who plays as a left-back for De Treffers. Born in the Netherlands, Dkidak represents Morocco internationally.

Club career
After playing youth football with SBV Vitesse and in the Tweede Divisie with Jong Vitesse, Dkidak joined FC Den Bosch on a trial basis on 27 July 2019, before signing a contract with Den Bosch on 9 August 2019. He made his debut for Den Bosch on 12 August 2019 in a 2–2 draw away at Jong PSV.

In August 2020, he signed for Italian side Como in Serie C. For the 2021–22 season, Como was promoted to Serie B and Dkidak made no appearances on that level. On 5 January 2022 he left the club.

On 8 January 2022, he signed with Potenza in Serie C. On 9 December 2022, Dkidak returned to the Netherlands to join De Treffers on a deal until the end of the 2022–23 season.

International career
Dkidak was born in Amsterdam and is of Moroccan descent. He represented the Morocco U17s at the 2017 Montaigu Tournament.

References

External links
 
 

2000 births
Living people
Footballers from Amsterdam
Moroccan footballers
Morocco youth international footballers
Dutch footballers
Dutch sportspeople of Moroccan descent
Association football fullbacks
SBV Vitesse players
FC Den Bosch players
Como 1907 players
Potenza Calcio players
De Treffers players
Eerste Divisie players
Tweede Divisie players
Serie C players
Moroccan expatriate footballers
Dutch expatriate footballers
Moroccan expatriate sportspeople in Italy
Dutch expatriate sportspeople in Italy
Expatriate footballers in Italy